The 2014 PBA D-League Foundation Cup is the second conference of the 2013-14 PBA Developmental League season.

Teams

Standings

Playoffs

Awards 

PBA D-League Foundation Cup
2013–14 in Philippine basketball